Landrake is a village in southeast Cornwall, England, United Kingdom. It is situated approximately three miles (5 km) west of Saltash in the civil parish of Landrake with St Erney (where the population of the 2011 census was included.). The A38 road passes through the village.

Landrake has a post office and shop, a pub named the Bullers Arms and Sir Robert Geffery's School, a primary school. The school takes its name from Landrake-born Sir Robert Geffery who, in 1704, bequeathed money to set up a trust to educate children of the parish.

Church

Landrake Church is dedicated to St Michael. It stands on a hill and the tower is 100 ft high. Parts of the building are Norman but the majority is of the 15th century. There is a brass to Edward Cowrtney, 1509. The church is a Grade I listed building, having been so designated on 23 January 1968.

King Edmund gave the parish of Landerch to Bishop Burhwold in exchange for land in Devon; in 1018 this gift was confirmed by King Cnut who declared the gift had really been for the benefit of the monastery of St Germans where the bishop had his see. The gift included the parish of Landrake with its chapel of St Erney; these continued to be held by the monastery after the see was moved to Devon. In 1269 a vicarage was established whereby the vicar received the small tithes of Landrake and St Erney and the great tithe was kept by the monastery.

Notable people
Francis Rous, an English politician, prominent Puritan and Provost of Eton spent some years at  Landrake. For some years he lived there in seclusion and occupied himself with theological studies.

See also

 People from Landrake

References

Villages in Cornwall